Viktor Kalabis (27 February 1923 – 28 September 2006) was a Czech composer, music editor, musicologist, and husband of harpsichordist Zuzana Růžičková.

Life
Born in Červený Kostelec, Kalabis was interested in music from a young age, but due to the Nazi occupation of Prague during the Second World War, he was unable to study music in Prague. After the end of the war, Kalabis studied at the Prague Conservatory and at the Academy of Music and Charles University.

In 1952, Kalabis married Zuzana Růžičková, who became a famous harpsichord player. They both refused to join the Communist Party, which impeded the beginning of their music careers. Eventually, Kalabis got work in the children's music section at Prague Radio, where he established the Concertino Praga competition for young musicians.

In 1957, Manuel Rosenthal performed Kalabis' Concert for violoncello op. 8 at the Orchestre de Paris at the Théâtre des Champs-Élysées, which brought Kalabis new opportunities. His works were commissioned, for example, by the Czech Philharmonic, the Dresden Philharmonic, Camerata Zurich, Josef Suk, The Suk Trio, János Starker, Maurice André, the Prague Spring Festival and others. His composition Sinfonia pacis is one of the world's most-played Czech contemporary music compositions.

Although most of Kalabis's works are symphonic, concertante or chamber compositions, his composed several vocal works such as the cantata Canticum Canticorum, the chamber cantata Vojna (The War), song cycles and choruses. For stage, he wrote the Fable for chamber orchestra and the two-part ballet score Dva světy (Two Worlds), inspired by Lewis Carroll's book Alice's Adventures in Wonderland. The video recording of this ballet was given the "Parents' Choice Award" of 1993 in the United States. In 1967, he received the Prize of the Czechoslovak Music Critics and in 1969 he was awarded the State Prize.

According to Aleš Březina, a close friend of Kalabis', "his beginnings in the fifties and in the early sixties were deeply influenced by people like Stravinsky and Hindemith, and Honegger and Bartók – and Martinů of course."

Eventually, Kalabis became President of the Bohuslav Martinů Foundation. Here he established the Bohuslav Martinů Institute for Studies and Information, launched the Martinů Festival and competition, and created a dynamic base from which Bohuslav Martinů's work has become far better known.

Death
Kalabis died on 28 September 2006. The Viktor Kalabis & Zuzana Růžičková Foundation was established in his memory, with Zuzana Růžičková as the President of the Board of Directors for the Foundation.

Works
The Viktor Kalabis and Zuzana Růžičková Foundation has the following list of musical compositions.

Ballets

 "Two Worlds"
 "Fable"

Symphonies

 Symphony No. 1
 Symphony No. 2 "Sinfonia pacis"
 Symphony No. 3 (1970–71)
 Symphony No. 4 (1972)
 Symphony No. 5 (1976)

Symphonic music

 Suita for orchestra "Festival of Straznice"
 Symphonic Variations
 Concerto for large orchestra

Instrumental concertos

 Concerto for piano and orchestra No. 1
 Concerto for piano and wind instruments No. 2
 Concerto for violin and orchestra No. 1
 Concerto for violin and orchestra No. 2
 Concerto for harpsichord and string orchestra
 Fantasia Concertante for viola and string orchestra
 Concerto for violoncello and orchestra
 Concerto for trumpet and orchestra ("Le Tambour de Villevielle")
 Concerto for bassoon and wind instruments

Compositions for chamber orchestra

 Diptych for string orchestra
 Chamber Music for Strings
 Concerto for Chamber Orchestra "Hommage a Stravinskij"

String quartets

 String Quartet No. 1
 String Quartet No. 2
 String Quartet No. 3
 String Quartet No. 4
 String Quartet No. 5 "In Memory of M. Chagall"
 String Quartet No. 6 "In Memory of B. Martinu"
 String Quartet No. 7

Piano quartet

 Ludus for piano quartet op. 82 (1996)

Nonets

 Classical Nonet
 Nonet "Homage to Nature"

Compositions for wind instruments

 Incantation - Tredecet Op. 69 for 2 Fl, Ob, Cor ingl, 2 Cl, 4 Cor, 2 Bsn, 1 movt., 11' - 13' 
 Septet "Strange Pipers" Op. 72 for 2 Ob, 2 Cor ingl, 2 Bsn, CBsn, Op. 72, 1 movt., 8'30'' - 10'
 Octet "Spring Whistles" Op. 50 (1979) for 2 Ob, 2 Cl, 2 Cor, 2 Bsn, 10'
 Divertimento for wind quintet Op. 10, 5 parts, 17' - 18'
 Small Chamber Music for wind quintet Op. 27, 3 movements, 11' - 12'

Duos with piano

 Sonata for violin and piano
 Hallelujah for violin and piano
 Sonata for viola and piano
 Sonata for cello and piano
 Sonata for clarinet and piano
 Suite for clarinet and piano
 Suite ("Bagpiper's") for oboe and piano
 Fantasie for oboe and piano
 Variations for French horn and piano
 Sonata for trombone and piano, Op. 32 (1970)

Duos with harpsichord

 Sonata for violin and harpsichord
 Dialogues for violoncello and harpsichord
 "Four Pictures" for flute and harpsichord

Duos for other instrumentation

 Duettina for violin and cello
 Duettina for cello and double bass
 3 Impressions for two clarinets
 Small Suite for two bassoons
 Couples for two flutes
 Compositions for solo instruments

Piano

 Accents (Expressive studies for piano)
 Entrata, Aria e Toccata for piano,
 3 Polkas for piano
 4 Enigmas for Graham
 2 Toccatas for piano
 Allegro impetuoso for piano
 I. Sonata
 II. Sonata
 III. Sonata

Harpsichord

 6 Two-Voices Canonic Inventions
 Aquarelles
 Preludio, Aria e Toccata, "I casi di Sisyphos"

Violoncello

 3 Monologues for cello solo
 Rondo Drammatico for cello solo

Flute

 3 Pieces for flute
 "Tempting" for flute

French horn

 Invocation for French horn solo

Guitar

 "Reminiscences"

Organ

 Symphonic Fresco for organ, "Afresco sinfonico"

Vocal Compositions

 Cantatas
 "Canticum canticorum" for mixed choir, chamber orchestra, alto, tenor
 "The War" for mixed choir, flute, and piano on folk poetry

Songs with orchestral accompaniment

 5 Romantic Love Songs to words by R.M. Rilke
 "Bird's Weddings" for higher voice and piano
 "Carousel of Life" for lower voice and piano to words by R.M. Rilke

Mixed choirs

 "Dawn", "Autumn", 2 choirs to words by Vl. Sefl
Children choirs
 Children Songs (with piano accompaniment)
 Album of Folksongs (with piano)
 4 Songs for Little Children (with piano)
 We Sing a Song (with flute and oboe)
 Three Children Choirs (with piano)

References

External links
 The Viktor Kalabis and Zuzana Růžičková Foundation, Washington DC
 The Viktor Kalabis and Zuzana Růžičková Endowment Fund, Prague
 The Dvořák Society for Czech and Slovak Music
 Czech Music Information Centre
 Schott Music Publishers
 Di-Arezzo scores of Viktor Kalabis
 Supraphon Producers

1923 births
2006 deaths
Ballet composers
Czech classical composers
Czech male classical composers
People from Červený Kostelec
Prague Conservatory alumni
20th-century Czech male musicians